The 8th Shanghai International Film Festival was a film festival held in 2005. The president of the 8th SIFF was Wu Tianming (China).

Jury members
Wu Tianming (China)
Jiang Wenli (China)
Kang Je-gyu (Korea)
Lisa Lu (USA)
Marc Rothemund（Germany）
Imanol Uribe (Spain)
Régis Wargnier (France)

Winners

Golden Goblet
Best Feature Film: Mura no shashinshuu, The Village Photobook, by Mitsuhiro Mihara (Japan)
Jury Grand Prix: Gimme Kudos, by Huang Jianxin (China)
Best Director: Rumle Hammerich, Young Andersen (Denmark)
Best Actress: Zhao Wei, A Time To Love (China)
Best Actor: Tatsuya Fuji, The Village Album (Japan)
Best Screenplay: Huang Xin/Yi Fan, Gimme Kudos (China)
Best Cinematography: Stuat Dryburgh, In My Father's Den (New Zealand)
Best Music: Dang Huu Phuc, A Time Far Past (Vietnam/France)

Special Jury Award
Official Selection Feature: Zee-Oui, by Buranee Rachjaibun, Nida Suthat Na Ayutthaya (Thailand)

Asian New Talent Award
Audience Award: Mongolian Ping Pong, by Hao Ning (China)
Best Director: Hassan Yektapanah, Story Undone (Persia)

Press Prize
Best Custom Design: Young Andersen, by Rumle Hammerich (Denmark)
Best Feature: , Gimme Kudos, by Huang Jianxin (China)
Exploring Spirit Award: , Gimme Kudos, by Huang Jianxin (China)

External links
2005 Shanghai International Film Festival
8th SIFF at the Internet Movie Database

S
S
Shan
Shanghai International Film Festival
21st century in Shanghai